Jan de Bie (30 May 1946 – 1 January 2021) was a Dutch painter and photographer.

Works
Dooibroek, Valk, Zwaluw (1973–1975)
Dooibroek Duiven (1981)
Zondag/Maandag (1985)
Papieren en Notulen van de Asgrauwe (2006) 
D'n Elvis (2007)

Catalogs
Werken 1973-1989 (1989)
The New Storytellers (1996)
Verf en inkt, doen en laten (2004)

References

20th-century Dutch artists
People from 's-Hertogenbosch
1946 births
2021 deaths